Brian Keast (born 27 November 1953) is a Canadian former cyclist. He competed in the team pursuit event at the 1972 Summer Olympics.

References

External links
 

1953 births
Living people
Canadian male cyclists
Olympic cyclists of Canada
Cyclists at the 1972 Summer Olympics
Sportspeople from Vancouver